Ismail Ahmed, Ismaeel Ahmed or Esmaeel Ahmad may refer to: 

 Isma'il ibn Ahmad (died 907), Samanid emir of Transoxiana and Khorasan
 Ismail Ahmed Cachalia (1908–2003), South African political activist
 Ismail Ahmed Rajab Al Hadidi (born 1955), Iraqi politician
 Ismail Ould Cheikh Ahmed (born 1960), Mauritanian diplomat
 Ismail Ahmad (basketball) (born 1976), Egyptian-Lebanese basketball player
 Ismail Ahmed (footballer, born 1983) (born 1983), Emarati footballer
 Ismail Ahmed Ismail (born 1984), Sudanese runner
 Ismail Ahmed Kadar Hassan (born 1987), Djiboutian footballer
 Ismail Ahmed (businessman), founder of WorldRemit

See also
 Ismail Ahmedani (1930–2007), Saraiki writer
 Ahmed Ismail (disambiguation)